This was the first edition of the tournament.

Rafael Matos and João Menezes won the title after defeating Treat Huey and Nathaniel Lammons 6–2, 6–2 in the final.

Seeds

Draw

References

External links
 Main draw

Iași Open - Doubles